Zinc finger CCCH domain-containing protein 11A is a protein that in humans is encoded by the ZC3H11A gene.

References

Further reading